Sociedad Gimnástica Lucense was a Spanish football club based in Lugo, in the autonomous community of Galicia.

History
Founded in 1943, the club immediately started to play in Tercera División, achieving promotion in 1949. After finishing 16th in the 1951–52 season, the club was dissolved. It happened on July 29, 1952 due to the unpaid debt. 

One year later, Gimnástica merged with CD Polvorín and created CD Lugo.

Season to season

3 season in Segunda División
6 seasons in Tercera División

References

External links
BDFutbol team profile
ArefePedia team profile 

Defunct football clubs in Galicia
Association football clubs established in 1943
Association football clubs disestablished in 1952
1943 establishments in Spain
1952 disestablishments in Spain
Sport in Lugo
Segunda División clubs